James Graham, 4th Duke of Montrose, KT, PC (16 July 1799 – 30 December 1874), styled Marquess of Graham until 1836, of Buchanan Castle in Stirlingshire (re-built by him in 1852–8) and 45 Belgrave Square in London, was a British Conservative politician.

Background and education
Montrose was the son of James Graham, 3rd Duke of Montrose, by his second wife Lady Caroline Maria, daughter of George Montagu, 4th Duke of Manchester. He was educated at Eton and Trinity College, Cambridge.

Cricket
A member of Marylebone Cricket Club, Montrose made a single first-class appearance for an All-England team against Hampshire in 1828. He was recorded in the scorecard as Lord James Graham and scored two runs.

Political career
In 1821, aged 21, Montrose was appointed Vice-Chamberlain of the Household, despite not having a seat in Parliament, and was sworn of the Privy Council the same year. He remained as Vice-Chamberlain until 1827. He was returned to Parliament for Cambridge in 1825, a seat he held until 1832, and served as a commissioner of the India Board between 1828 and 1830. In 1836 he succeeded his father in the dukedom and entered the House of Lords.

When the Earl of Derby became Prime Minister in February 1852, Montrose was appointed Lord Steward of the Household, a post he retained until the government fell in December of the same year. He again served under Derby as Chancellor of the Duchy of Lancaster between 1858 and 1859 and under Derby and later Benjamin Disraeli as Postmaster General between 1866 and 1868, although he was never a member of the Cabinet. As Postmaster General he introduced the Electric Telegraphs Bill which resulted in the transfer of British telegraph companies to the Post Office.

Apart from his political career Montrose served as Chancellor of the University of Glasgow between 1837 and 1874 (succeeding his father) and as Lord Lieutenant of Stirlingshire between 1843 and 1874. He was made a Knight of the Thistle in 1845.

Marriage & issue
In 1836 he married Hon. Caroline Agnes Horsley-Beresford (1818-1894), a daughter of John Beresford, 2nd Baron Decies. In 1860, they were both survivors of the train involved in the Atherstone rail accident. She survived him and in 1876 married secondly to William Stuart Stirling-Crawfurd (1819-1883) (whom she also survived) of Milton in Lanarkshire and of Cannes, South of France, where he died, without issue. By his wife he had issue including:

Sons
 Lord James John Graham (1845–1846), who died in infancy.
 Lord James Graham (1847–1872), styled by the courtesy title of Marquess of Graham, eldest surviving son and heir apparent, who predeceased his father by two years.
 Douglas Graham, 5th Duke of Montrose (1852–1925), only surviving son and heir, who married Violet Hermione Graham, second daughter of Sir Frederick Ulric Graham, 3rd Baronet.

Daughters
 Lady Agnes Caroline Graham (1839–1873), who married Lt. Col. John Murray of Touchadam and Polmaise in 1859.
 Lady Beatrice Violet Graham (1842–1932), was a writer (she married Algernon Greville, 2nd Baron Greville in 1863).
 Lady Alma Imogen Leonora Carlotta Graham DGStJ (1854–1932), who married Gavin Campbell, 1st Marquess of Breadalbane in 1872.

Death
He died in December 1874, aged 75, and was succeeded in the dukedom by his son, Douglas Graham, 5th Duke of Montrose (1852–1925).

References

External links

1799 births
1874 deaths
Chancellors of the Duchy of Lancaster
204
United Kingdom Postmasters General
Knights of the Thistle
Members of the Privy Council of the United Kingdom
Lord-Lieutenants of Stirlingshire
Montrose, 4th Duke of
Graham, James Graham, Viscount
Graham, James Graham, Viscount
Graham, James Graham, Viscount
Graham, James Graham, Viscount
Graham, James Graham, Viscount
UK MPs who inherited peerages
Alumni of Trinity College, Cambridge
People educated at Eton College
English cricketers
English cricketers of 1826 to 1863
Non-international England cricketers
Survivors of railway accidents or incidents